Anna Tarrés Campà (born 19 October 1967) is a synchronized swimming coach and former national synchronized swimmer from Spain. She competed in the women's duet at the 1984 Summer Olympics. After retiring from competition Tarrés began coaching at her swimming club, CN Kallipolis, in 1987, where she coached Gemma Mengual to international success. In 1997 she was appointed as head coach of the Spanish national synchronised swimming team: during her time in charge the team enjoyed great success, taking four Olympic medals, 26 World Championship medals, and 25 European Championship medals, however in September 2012 the Royal Spanish Swimming Federation informed her that her contract would not be extended beyond the end of the year. Shortly afterwards 15 former members of the team issued a public letter criticising Tarrés for using authoritarian and demeaning behaviour in her role as head coach, although Mengual and national team captain Andrea Fuentes both spoke in Tarrés' defence, and Fuentes subsequently announced her retirement from elite competition in January 2013 due to demotivation as a result of the conflict between Tarrés and the federation. After leaving the Spanish national team Tarrés was appointed as one of the coaches of the Ukrainian national team in 2015.

She was elected deputy in the Parliament of Catalonia in the 21 December 2017 Catalan regional elections.

References 

1967 births
Living people
Spanish synchronized swimmers
Olympic synchronized swimmers of Spain
Synchronized swimmers at the 1984 Summer Olympics
Spanish swimming coaches
Members of the 12th Parliament of Catalonia
21st-century Spanish women politicians
Members of the Parliament of Catalonia
Women politicians from Catalonia
People from Barcelona
Synchronized swimming coaches